Surya TV is an Malayalam-language Indian general entertainment pay television channel. The channel is part of Sun TV Network, which is headquartered at Thiruvananthapuram, Kerala. On 16 March 2017, Surya TV became the third Malayalam-language channel to launch a high-definition simulcast feed broadcasting at 1080i. It is available live on Sun NXT app.

Current broadcast

Former broadcast

Original series

Dubbed series

Children's serials 
Babajaan (2005)
Butterflies (2012)
Hello Mayavi (2009)
Hai Robo (2014)
Ividam Swargamaanu (2011)
Kuttichathan (2008)

Comedy series 
Ammayi Lahala (2004)
Bharyamar Sookshikkuka (2006)
Calling Bell (2005)
Chakkarabharani (2010-2012)
Chakyarum Kappyaryum Pinne Oru Moylyaarum (2011)
Culcutta Hospital (2005)
Ettu Sundarikalum Njaanum (2004-2005)
Indumukhi Chandramathi (2005)
Indumukhi Chandramathi 2 (2015-2016)
In Panchali House (2013-2014)
John Jaffer Janardanan (2020)
Kaliyil Alppam Kaaryam (2008)
Nurungugal (2000-2002)
Oru Bhayangara Veedu (2019-2020)
Sambhavaami Yuge Yuge (2001)
Thiruda Thirudi (2007)
Vaa Mone Dinesha (2005)

Reality shows

References

External links 
 Sun TV Network

Malayalam-language television channels
1998 establishments in Kerala
Television channels and stations established in 1998
Sun Group
Television stations in Thiruvananthapuram